Ana Fernández (born 29 May 1965) is a Spanish actress. Born in Valencina de la Concepción, Seville, for her performance in Benito Zambrano's Solas in 1999 Fernández won the Goya Award for Best New Actress.  She also appeared in Pedro Almodóvar's Talk to Her.

Filmography

Film

Television

References

External links
 

1965 births
People from Seville (comarca)
Spanish film actresses
Spanish television actresses
Goya Award winners
Living people
20th-century Spanish actresses
21st-century Spanish actresses